= Mincar, West Virginia =

- Unincorporated community
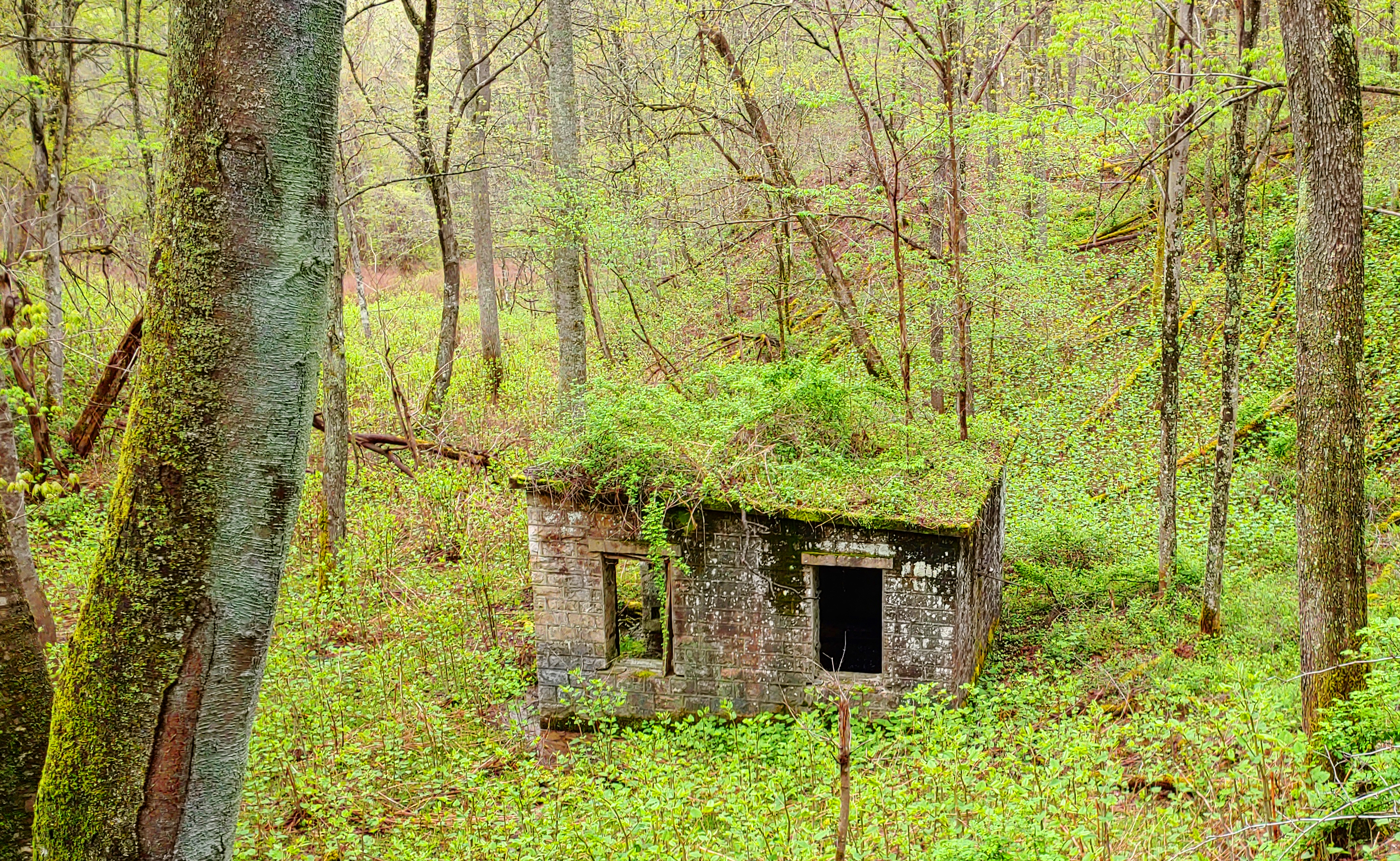

- Location within West Virginia Location within the United States
- Coordinates: 38°00′32″N 81°2′1″W
- Country: United States
- State: West Virginia
- County: Fayette
- Elevation: 1,588 ft (484 m)
- Time zone: UTC-5 (Eastern (EST))
  - Summer (DST): UTC-4 (EDT)
- GNIS ID: 1556148

Mincar was an unincorporated community and coal town in Fayette County, West Virginia.
